Gustave Charmoille (born 16 September 1878, date of death unknown) was a French gymnast. He competed in the men's artistic individual all-around event at the 1908 Summer Olympics.

References

1878 births
Year of death missing
French male artistic gymnasts
Olympic gymnasts of France
Gymnasts at the 1906 Intercalated Games
Gymnasts at the 1908 Summer Olympics
Place of birth missing